Lou mei is the Cantonese name given to dishes made by braising in a sauce known as a master stock or lou sauce ( or ). The dish is known as lu wei in Taiwan.

Lou mei can be made from meat, offal, and other off-cuts. The most common varieties are beef, pork, duck and chicken. A vegan meat analogue zaai lou mei, made with wheat gluten, is commonly found in Hong Kong. Lou mei originates in Southern China, is a core part of Hokkien and Teochew cuisine, and is widely available in China and Taiwan with many regional varieties.  Selections vary greatly among overseas Chinatowns often depending on the immigrant mix.

Lou mei can be served cold or hot.  Cold lou mei is often served with a side of hot braising liquid for immediate mixing.  Hot lou mei is often served directly from the pot of braising liquid.

Varieties

Common varieties include:

 Chinese stewed chicken
 Chinese stewed duck
 Duck/goose meat
 Chicken wings
 Duck flippers
 Chicken claw
 Tofu
 Pig's ear
 Steamed fish intestines 
 Stir-fried fish intestines
 Beef entrails
 Beef brisket
 Duck gizzard
 Pig tongue
 pork hock
 Pig's blood
 spiced corned egg
 Kelp
 Vegetarian

See also
Phá lấu
Sekba

Cantonese cuisine
Cantonese words and phrases